Adolf Saves the Day (Swedish: Adolf klarar skivan) is a 1938 Swedish comedy film directed by and starring Adolf Jahr and also featuring Artur Cederborgh, Eleonor de Floer and Hilding Gavle. The film's sets were designed by the art director Bertil Duroj.

Synopsis
Adolf Jansson gets a job as a servant for a wealthy family.

Cast
 Adolf Jahr as Adolf Jansson
 Artur Cederborgh as 	August Pettersson
 Anna Hillberg as Adele Pettersson
 Eleonor de Floer as 	Susette Pettersson
 Hilding Gavle as Count Sixten von Jahn
 Olga Appellöf as 	Miss Sandin
 Eivor Engelbrektsson as 	Viola
 Georg Funkquist as 	Butler
 Gösta Gustafson as 	Patent Official
 Linnéa Hillberg as 	Gullan Hansson
 Elsa Holmquist as 	Karin Hansson
 Elsa Jahr as 	Stina
 Arne Lindblad as 	Berg
 Vera Lundquist as 	Greta
 Lotten Olsson as Mrs. Bohman
 Charley Paterson as 	Sirius Jansson
 Viran Rydkvist as 	Liskulla
 Margit Tirkkonen as 	Stina
 John Westin as 	Man in Search of Employment
 Emmy Albiin as 	Old Woman in Search of Employment 
 Wilma Malmlöf as 	Old Woman in Search of Employment 
 Ullastina Rettig as 	Young woman at Party 
 Oscar Åberg as Dinner Guest

References

Bibliography 
 Larsson, Mariah & Marklund, Anders. Swedish Film: An Introduction and Reader. Nordic Academic Press, 2010.

External links 
 

1938 films
1938 comedy films
Swedish comedy films
1930s Swedish-language films
Swedish black-and-white films
Films directed by Adolf Jahr
1930s Swedish films